The House of Godwin was an Anglo-Saxon family and one of the leading noble families in England during the last 50 years before the Norman Conquest.  Its most famous member was Harold Godwinson, king of England for nine months in 1066.

The founder of the family's greatness, Earl Godwin, was raised from comparative obscurity by king Cnut and given the earldom of Wessex around the year 1020.  He retained his position during the reigns of Cnut's sons Harold Harefoot and Harthacnut, and consolidated it when king Edward the Confessor conferred earldoms on Sweyn and Harold, Godwin's two eldest sons by his Danish wife, Gytha.  The family survived a short-lived attempt by the king to exile them.  After Godwin's death his sons held the earldoms of Wessex, East Anglia, and later Northumbria; Harold in particular became the most powerful man in England, eclipsing the power of the king.  When Edward the Confessor died childless in 1066 he was succeeded by Harold Godwinson.  Harold gained a great victory over the Norwegian invader Harald Hardrada and his own estranged brother Tostig Godwinson at the battle of Stamford Bridge.  Three weeks later, with his defeat and death at the battle of Hastings, Anglo-Saxon self-rule came to an end.  Later generations of the family were scattered around northern Europe, one branch prospering in Norway and furnishing that country with one of its kings, Inge II, and a pretender to the throne, Skule Bårdsson.  Through female lines the Godwin family are ancestors of royal houses across Europe.

Origins 

Godwin, Earl of Wessex, after whom the family is named, was the son of one Wulfnoth, probably to be identified with Wulfnoth Cild, a Sussex thegn who in 1009, having been accused of unspecified crimes, deserted the service of the English king Æthelred the Unready along with a fleet of twenty ships.  Wulfnoth Cild may also have been father of Ælfwig, abbot of New Minster, who died at the battle of Hastings, and of a daughter called Æthelflaed; he is known to have died by 1014.  The writer Alfred Anscombe claimed a lineage for this Wulfnoth stretching back through Æthelmær the Stout and the chronicler Æthelweard to king Æthelred I of Wessex, which would make the house of Godwin a branch of the house of Cerdic; but most historians are skeptical of this theory and treat Wulfnoth's ancestry as unknown.

Godwin under the Danish kings 

The date of Godwin's birth is estimated to have been around the year 993.  He first appears in history as an adherent of Æthelstan Ætheling, the eldest son of Æthelred the Unready, and when that prince died in 1014 he left Godwin an estate.  Godwin is surmised to have then given his allegiance to Athelstan's brother Edmund Ironside during the short remainder of Æthelred's life and Edmund's own brief reign, and to have supported him in his campaigns against the invading Danish king Cnut.  With Edmund's death in 1016 and Cnut's acquisition of the English crown Godwin seems to have made his peace with the new king.  He survived Cnut's purge of English nobles, and indeed prospered, being made earl first of the eastern part of Wessex and then, perhaps in 1020, of the whole province.  He also about 1022 married Gytha, sister of the Danish earl Ulf, who was himself Cnut's brother-in-law.  He was, by 1023, considered the leading magnate in Cnut's English kingdom, loyally supporting Cnut and implicitly trusted by him.  When Cnut died in 1035 the succession was disputed between Cnut's two sons Harthacnut and Harold Harefoot; Godwin was one of Harthacnut's most influential supporters, but Harold ultimately prevailed.  In 1036 another of Æthelred's sons, Alfred, made an expedition to England, where he fell into the hands first of Godwin and then of Harold Harefoot, who had him blinded.  Alfred did not survive this operation, but it is unclear whether this was a deliberate execution on Harold's part, and still more unclear how much responsibility, if any, attaches to Godwin.  Nevertheless, a cloud of suspicion hung over him for the rest of his life, and when, in 1040, Harold died, the new king, Harthacnut, exacted an oath from Godwin that he had been innocent of everything except obeying Harold's orders.

Godwin's rivalry with Edward the Confessor 

In 1042 Harthacnut died, and was succeeded, with Godwin's hefty support, by Edward the Confessor, brother of the unfortunate Alfred.  Godwin by now had a large family, six sons and three daughters, and the elder sons were becoming old enough to take on responsibilities of their own, while Edward needed to reward the man who had, more than any other, secured him the crown.  Sweyn is usually accounted Godwin's eldest son, though the monk Hemming reported him as believing his real father had been Cnut; in 1043 he was given an earldom consisting of Somerset, Gloucestershire, Herefordshire, Oxfordshire and Berkshire.  Godwin's second son, Harold, was made earl of East Anglia the following year.  In 1045 Beorn Estrithson, Godwin's wife's nephew, was given an earldom in the east Midlands, and the same year the seal was set on the family's grasp of power when Godwin's eldest daughter, Edith, married king Edward.  The Godwin family now held four English earldoms, only Mercia and Northumbria remaining in other hands, and had their representative even in the king's bedchamber.  By contrast, Edward's personal estate, though very large, was probably smaller than that held by his ancestors, and was scattered between various earldoms, meaning that he had no local power base; moreover he had only recently returned to England as a half-Norman stranger with no experience of English politics or of any kind of leadership.  A struggle for power between king and earl now began.

The first setback for the Godwin family stemmed from Sweyn's wild and irresponsible conduct.  He first allied himself with Gruffydd ap Llywelyn, king of Gwynedd and Powys, who might be considered a natural enemy of the English, and launched with him a joint expedition into south Wales.  On his return he either seduced or abducted the abbess of Leominster and kept her as his wife for a year, a scandal which resulted in his being outlawed by the king.  Sweyn's lands were divided between his brother Harold and cousin Beorn, while he himself moved on first to Flanders and then to Denmark.  Two years later, in 1049, he returned intending to regain his lands, but instead murdered Beorn.  He was again outlawed and returned to Flanders, but the king allowed him to return in 1050.  Despite his leniency in this matter, Edward was beginning to move against the Godwin family.  He gave the murdered Beorn's earldom to his own nephew Ralph the Timid rather than to anyone allied to Godwin; he countermanded the election to the archbishopric of Canterbury of Godwin's kinsman Ælric, substituting instead Robert of Jumièges, an enemy of the Godwin clan; and he allowed a small number of castles to be built, or at least planned, by various of his foreign favourites in the earldoms held by Godwin and his sons.

Matters came to a head in 1051 when the men of Eustace, Count of Boulogne, who was passing through Dover, got involved in a fight with the townspeople.  King Edward decided that Dover should be harried as a punishment, and ordered Godwin, within whose earldom Dover lay, to carry out the sentence.  Godwin refused, and prepared for the king's displeasure.  He and his sons gathered an army, the earls of Mercia and Northumbria assembled their men in defence of the king, and the result was a stalemate in which neither side wanted to attack the other.  It was agreed that a meeting of the witan would resolve the dispute, but when the king called up the English militia Godwin's side found themselves outnumbered there.  The result was that the whole family was banished.  Godwin, his wife, and their sons Sweyn, Tostig and Gyrth fled to Bruges in Flanders, and Harold and his brother Leofwine to Ireland, while their sister queen Edith was sent to a nunnery.  The following year, 1052, Godwin and Harold both launched small fleets, joined up off the south-west coast of England, then recruited support from the ports of Sussex and Kent.  This combined and augmented fleet sailed to London, where Godwin forced a new settlement of his differences with the king, entirely in his own favour.  His and his family's earldoms were restored to them, the queen was recalled, and most of the king's numerous French favourites were outlawed.  So firmly had the family regained its grip on power that Edward never again tried his strength against them.  But Godwin did not enjoy his triumph long.  In 1053, while celebrating Easter at Winchester along with some of his sons and the king, he suddenly collapsed and after a few days died.  In the following century chroniclers embroidered the story with details suggesting that this was divine retribution; in the fullest form of the legend he takes a mouthful of bread, praying that he may not be allowed to swallow it if he was guilty of murdering the king's brother Alfred, then chokes and dies.

Godwin's sons 

Godwin's second son, Harold, succeeded him in the earldom of Wessex, while Harold's old earldom of East Anglia was taken by Ælfgar, son of the earl of Mercia.  Godwin's eldest son, Sweyn, could not be considered for any title since he had gone on pilgrimage to Jerusalem, and indeed was to die in September 1052 on the return journey.  Over the next few years one earldom after another fell vacant and was granted to Harold's various younger brothers.  First Siward, earl of Northumbria, died in 1055 and was succeeded by Tostig.  Then in 1057 the earl of Mercia died and was succeeded by his son Ælfgar, freeing up East Anglia; a reduced form of this earldom was bestowed on Gyrth, while the counties of Essex, Hertfordshire, Buckinghamshire, Middlesex, Surrey and Kent were formed into a new earldom for Leofwine.  The same year king Edward's nephew Ralph the Timid died, and his earldom of Hereford was added to Harold's Wessex.  The Godwin family thus held the whole of England apart from Mercia under the kingship of Edward the Confessor, who was by now largely content to leave effective rule to his earls.

In 1063 Harold launched a cavalry raid intended to kill Gruffydd ap Llewelyn, who since 1055 had been ruling the whole of Wales, but it failed in its objective.  He returned to the attack the same year along with his brother Tostig in a joint invasion of Wales, using both land and naval forces, which wreaked such destruction that Gruffydd's own men killed him and sent his head to Harold.

Not long afterwards, probably in 1064, Harold is thought to have set out on a voyage in the English Channel and been blown by a storm onto the coast of Ponthieu, whose count delivered him into the hands of William the Bastard, Duke of Normandy.  It is not known what the purpose of Harold's journey was.  Norman writers later alleged that he had been sent by king Edward to confirm William as heir to the English throne and to swear fealty to him, but his biographer Ian W. Walker considers the most likely possibilities to be, firstly, that he was seeking a marriage alliance between his family and William's; secondly, that he wanted to negotiate the release of his youngest brother Wulfnoth and Sweyn's son Hakon, who had long been held hostage in Normandy; and thirdly, that he was bound elsewhere for reasons unknown.  Harold accompanied William on a campaign against Brittany, and then was coerced into swearing an oath that he would support William's claim to be Edward's heir.  Finally, he was allowed to return home.

Tostig's record as earl of Northumbria was a mixed one.  In external affairs he was rather successful, forming a friendship with the king of Scotland which largely prevented trouble on his northern border, and leading a legation to Rome on Edward's behalf.  But inside his earldom his over-harsh measures to keep the king's peace made him unpopular with his own nobles.  In 1065, while Tostig was at king Edward's court in the south of England, they revolted against him, murdered his men, and demanded his banishment.  Harold, unwilling to provoke a civil war, refused to invade Northumbria to reinstate him, and king Edward reluctantly acceded to the rebels' demands and exiled Tostig.  Furious at his brother's failure to support him, Tostig left for Flanders, and there is evidence that he visited William of Normandy, king Sweyn II of Denmark, and king Harald Hardrada of Norway, in an attempt to find allies who could return him to power.  The earldom of Northumbria was given to Morcar, brother of the Mercian earl Edwin, and Harold allied himself to the brothers by marrying their sister Ealdgyth.  At the beginning of 1066 Edward the Confessor died childless, after having apparently named Harold as his heir.  The witan, preferring the claims of Harold to those of the late king's great-nephew, the boy Edgar Ætheling, elected him as king, and he was crowned the day after Edward's death.  His reign was to last just nine months, and, as the Anglo-Saxon Chronicle says, "he met little quiet in it as long as he ruled the realm".

Harold II 

Harold faced threats from the duke of Normandy, from the king of Norway, and from possible Welsh raiders, but the first to act was his own brother Tostig, who in the spring of 1066 launched raids on the Isle of Wight and various points on the east coast of England before suffering a severe defeat in Lincolnshire and taking refuge in Scotland.  Harold, expecting an invasion by William of Normandy, moved to the south coast to prepare his defences, but on 8 September, unable to provision his forces any longer, he was compelled to disband them.  The same month, Harald Hardrada set out from Norway on his attempt to take the English crown, sailing via Shetland and Orkney and joining up with Tostig at the river Tyne, where the latter took service under him as one of his earls.  Together they engaged a Northumbrian army at Fulford in Yorkshire, gained a complete victory, and took the city of York.  Harold Godwinson hurriedly recalled his army and by forced marches was able to surprise Harald and Tostig's army at Stamford Bridge on 25 September, only five days after the battle of Fulford, and inflicted a crushing defeat on them.  He allowed the few survivors, including Tostig's sons Skule and Ketel, to return in peace to Norway.  Three days later duke William landed his invasion fleet at Pevensey in Sussex, then moved on to Hastings and began to ravage the Sussex countryside, part of Harold's old earldom of Wessex.  This achieved its intended effect of provoking Harold to march south with all speed.  On 14 October the two armies met seven miles north of Hastings, where the town of Battle now stands.  Harold, accompanied by his brothers Gyrth and Leofwine, commanded an army that was now badly overtired and proved unable to withstand the repeated Norman attacks.  By the end of the day Harold's army was comprehensively defeated, all three brothers were dead, and the ruin of Anglo-Saxon England was accomplished.

The family disperses 

Only two members of the family were allowed to live undisturbed in England under Norman rule.  Edward the Confessor's widow Edith, daughter of Godwin, lived in retirement, remaining in possession of all her private lands, until her death in 1075.  She was buried near her husband in Westminster Abbey.  Her niece Gunhild, daughter of Harold Godwinson, was an inmate of the nunnery in Wilton until 1093, when she was abducted by Alan the Red, a Breton who held the lordship of Richmond.  She lived with him, and then with his successor Alan the Black, after which she disappears from history.

Godwin's youngest son, Wulfnoth (b. c. 1036), was kept as a hostage in Normandy from 1051 until William the Conqueror's death in 1087, and was then transferred to Winchester by William Rufus, where he may have become a monk.  He is thought to have died about 1094.

In the aftermath of the battle of Hastings Godwin's widow, Gytha, by then in her sixties, withdrew to the south-west of England, where she held vast estates and where resistance to the Conquest was mounting.  William the Conqueror turned his attention to crushing this resistance at the beginning of 1068, and laid siege to the city of Exeter, but Gytha had already fled, probably with her daughter Gunhild and Harold's daughter Gytha, and taken refuge first on an island in the Bristol Channel, probably Steep Holm, and then at Saint-Omer in Flanders.  Harold's young sons Godwin and Edmund, and possibly also their brother Magnus, may have been at the siege of Exeter; certainly they made their way to the court of king Diarmait of Leinster in Ireland, from where they launched two unsuccessful raids against south-west England.  Two of the sons, probably Godwin and Edmund, survived to join their relatives in Saint-Omer.  From there the whole party seems to have proceeded to Denmark in the hope that its king, Sweyn II, would help them regain their position in England.  Sweyn failed them in this, but after a few years he arranged an advantageous marriage for the younger Gytha with Vladimir Monomakh, Prince of Smolensk and later Grand Prince of Kiev.  Their descendants intermarried with royal houses across Europe, and transmitted the blood of the Godwins to, among many others, the present queens of Great Britain and Denmark.

Ulf, a younger son of Harold Godwinson, was captured at some point by William the Conqueror, and was held prisoner in Normandy.  At the death of William the Conqueror his son Robert Curthose released and knighted Ulf, but no more is known of his life.

Harold, the youngest and probably posthumous son of Harold Godwinson, was taken by his mother to Dublin, and later went to Norway, where he was welcomed by the king.  In 1098 he was one of the men Magnus III Barelegs took with him on an expedition to Orkney, the Hebrides, the Isle of Man and Anglesey.  No further mention of Harold appears in any source.

After the battle of Stamford Bridge and the death of Harald Hardrada, Skule and Ketel, the two sons of Tostig Godwinson, were taken to Norway under the wing of Hardrada's son Olaf.  Olaf, who became king of Norway, gave land to Ketel and arranged a good marriage for him; according to the 13th-century saga-writer Snorri Sturluson, "from him are descended many great people".  Skule became known as Skule Kongsfostre (king's foster-son), and was remembered as a remarkably intelligent and handsome man who commanded the king's hird.  He married a relative of the king, Gudrun Nevsteinsdotter, and their son was Åsolv of Rein (in Rissa), father of the lendmann Guttorm of Rein.  Guttorm's son, Bård Guttormsson of Rein, was a close friend and supporter of king Sverre Sigurdsson, fought alongside him in several battles, and was rewarded by being given the king's half-sister, Cecilia Sigurdsdotter, in marriage.  Bård and Cecilia's son Inge Bårdsson was born about the year 1185.  In 1204, when the child-king Guttorm Sigurdsson died, the two obvious candidates for the crown were Inge and his half-brother Haakon Galen, Cecilia's son by another husband.  After a struggle for power Inge was recognized as king, while Haakon retained his former command of the army.  This did not produce peace, for a faction known as the Bagler succeeded in splitting the kingdom, with Inge ruling the western half and their own candidate, Philip Simonsson, the eastern half.  Moreover, earl Haakon renewed his own claim to the crown, a claim which only lapsed with his death in 1214.  King Inge himself died in 1217.  Since 1213 the leader of the army and the hird had been Inge's half-brother Skule, a son of Bård Guttormsson by another wife, Ragnfrid Erlingsdotter, and therefore, like king Inge, fifth in descent in the male line from Tostig Godwinson.  The new king, Haakon IV, was no more than a boy, with Skule acting as his regent.  In 1225 Skule married his young daughter, Margrete, to the king, but this did not succeed in establishing perfect amity between the two men, and in 1239 Skule went into open rebellion, claiming the title of king for himself.  The subsequent war went against him, and he was killed in 1240.  From Haakon IV and Margrete Skulesdotter descend subsequent kings of Norway down to the present day.

Family tree 

This family tree shows the generally accepted male-line descendants of Wulfnoth Cild, though some of the known male-line descendants of Guttorm of Rein have been excluded in the interests of clarity.

Footnotes

References

External links 

|-

|-